Emmalocera signicollis is a species of snout moth in the genus Emmalocera. It was described by Carlos Berg in 1875. It is found in Argentina.

References

Moths described in 1875
Emmalocera